Montney is an unincorporated locality located in British Columbia about  north of Fort St. John, near Beatton Provincial Park.

The settlement gives the name to the Montney Formation, a gas-bearing geological unit first described in a well located north-west of the hamlet.

The name of the town is an Anglicized form of an Indigenous name.  The fact that the name is spelled the same as the Montney family name is purely coincidental.

References

BCGNIS listing "Montney (Locality)"

Peace River Country
Populated places in the Peace River Regional District
Unincorporated settlements in British Columbia